Gressittia is a genus of horse flies in the family Tabanidae.

Species
Gressittia apicalis Philip & Mackerras, 1960
Gressittia aterrima (Schuurmans Stekhoven, 1926)
Gressittia baoxingensis Wang & Liu, 1990
Gressittia birumis Philip & Mackerras, 1960
Gressittia emeishanensis Wang & Liu, 1990
Gressittia flava Philip & Mackerras, 1960
Gressittia fusca (Schuurmans Stekhoven, 1926)
Gressittia mackerrasi Philip, 1963
Gressittia media Philip & Mackerras, 1960
Gressittia nepalensis Philip & Mackerras, 1960
Gressittia pulchripennis (Austen, 1937)
Gressittia titsadaysi Philip, 1980

References

Brachycera genera
Tabanidae
Diptera of Asia
Diptera of Africa
Taxa named by Cornelius Becker Philip